Ghazala Rahman Rafiq is an educationist, and social reformer from Karachi, Sindh, Pakistan. She is daughter of the eminent Hassanally A. Rahman.  She was one of the founder members of Women's Action Forum in 1981.

Education and career
Rafiq did her Ph.D in Education from University of California, Santa Barbara, USA. After completing her PhD, Rafiq as an academic was interested to preserve Sindhi language.  She is director of The Sindh Abhyas Academy (SAA) which is housed at Shaheed Zulfikar Ali Bhutto Institute of Science and Technology (SZABIST), Karachi. The institute offers education for the subject of Sindh Studies including Sindh’s history, geography, culture, economics, anthropology and philosophy  for undergraduate and graduate degrees.

Publications
In addition to that she is a freelance writer and has written numerous articles on Education Policy in Sindh and Pakistan. She has also written in Dawn News, The Friday Times and The Express Tribune.

References

Pakistani educational theorists
Pakistani women's rights activists
Living people
Year of birth missing (living people)